Georges Garnier (1878 – 1936) was a French football player who competed in the 1900 Olympic Games. In Paris he won a silver medal as a member of Club Française club team.

References

External links

1878 births
1936 deaths
French footballers
France international footballers
Olympic silver medalists for France
Olympic footballers of France
Footballers at the 1900 Summer Olympics
Olympic medalists in football
Medalists at the 1900 Summer Olympics
Association football forwards
Club Français players
Date of birth missing
Date of death missing
Place of birth missing
Place of death missing